Monk Bretton is a ward in the metropolitan borough of Barnsley, South Yorkshire, England.  The ward contains 14 listed buildings that are recorded in the National Heritage List for England.  Of these, three are listed at Grade I, the highest of the three grades, and the others are at Grade II, the lowest grade.  The ward contains the village of Monk Bretton and the surrounding area.  In the ward are the remains of Monk Bretton Priory, its gatehouse and an administrative block, all, listed at Grade I.  The other listed buildings are houses, farmhouses and farm buildings, a former water mill, a market cross, and a church.


Key

Buildings

References

Citations

Sources

 

Lists of listed buildings in South Yorkshire
Buildings and structures in the Metropolitan Borough of Barnsley